José Alejandro Vladimir Rodríguez Elizondo (born 10 June 1936) is a Chilean lawyer and diplomat who was awarded with the National Prize of Humanities and Social Sciences in 2021. He finished his Bachelor of Arts in laws in 1960 at the University of Chile, his alma mater.

During the Popular Unity (1970−1973), Rodríguez Elizondo worked in the Corporación de Fomento de la Producción (CORFO). Following the 1973 coup d'état, he went into exile to East Germany, where then he scaped to the West Germany in mid 1970s. After that, he based in Peru from 1977 to 1986, where he worked for Caretas magazine alongside figures like the writer Mario Vargas Llosa.

He has been a columnist in media like El Líbero, liberal e-newspaper. Similarly, he has gained renown through his book «History of the civil-military relationship in Chile», work that has been released in interviews like the developed by Tomás Mosciatti in April 2018.

Early life
In 1952, he finished the High School at the Liceo de Aplicación.

Works

Books
He has written 22 books:

 «Vietnam: testimony and analysis». Orbe Editorial, Buenos Aires, 1968.
 «Mithology of the far-left». Austral Editorial, Santiago de Chile, 1971.
 «Introduction to the chilean fascism». Ayuso Editorial, México City, 1976.
 «Democracy and Human Rights in Latinamerica». Spanish Agency of International Cooperation, Madrid, 1989.
 «The United Nations in Spain». University of Salamanca Editorial, 1991.
 «The crisis of the left-wings in Latinamerica». Co-edited by the Iberoamerican Cooperation Institute and the New Society Editorial, Caracas-Madrid, 1990.
 «Vargas Llosa: History of a double patricide». La Noria Editorial, 1993.
 «The law is stronger. Chilean civilians and military amid a historical process». Zeta Editorial Group, 1995.
 «The Neruda that I met». Aurora Editorial, 2000.
 «The Pope and his Jewish brothers». Andrés Bello Editorial, Santiago de Chile, 2001.
 «Chile, a case of a successful underdevelopment: from the Fit State of Portales to the State in formation of Lagos». Andrés Bello Editorial, Santiago de Chile, 2002
 «Chile-Perú, the century where we live in danger». La Tercera Mondadori Editorial, Santiago de Chile, 2004.
 «The crisis with neighboring countries during Ricardo Lagos government». Random House Mondadori Editorial, 2006.
 «From Charaña to The Hague». La Tercera Editorial, Santiago de Chile, 2009.
 «Post-The Hague themes». Editorial Planeta, 2010.
 «Falklands War. New in progress: 1982−2012». El Mercurio Aguilar, Santiago de Chile, 2012.
 «History of two demands: Perú and Bolivia against Chile». El Mercurio Editions, Santiago de Chile, 2014.
 «The world also exists: the last two decades of the planet, Chile included». RIL Editors, 2014.
 «All about Bolivia». El Mercurio Editions, Santiago de Chile, 2016.
 «Selection of Reality and Perspectives». RIL Editors, Santiago de Chile, 2017.
 «History of the civil-military relationship in Chile». Fondo de Cultura Económica, Santiago de Chile, 2018.
 «The day which they killed me». Catalonia Editorial, Santiago de Chile, 2019.

Novels
 «So as not to kill the general». Editorial Planeta, Santiago, 1993.
 «The passion of Iñaki». Andrés Bello Editorial, Santiago, 1997.

Stories
 «Nosferatu and other exiles». Aconcagua Editorial, Santiago, 1985.
 «A first nude and other tales of humor and wonder». Radio Universidad de Chile Editorial, Santiago, 2007.

References

External links
Profile at Chilean Academy of Sciences

1936 births
Living people
Chilean people
University of Chile alumni
Academic staff of the University of Chile
Chilean former marxists
Communist Party of Chile politicians
Members of Amarillos por Chile